The meridian 82° west of Greenwich is a line of longitude that extends from the North Pole across the Arctic Ocean, North America, the Gulf of Mexico, the Caribbean Sea, Panama, the Pacific Ocean, the Southern Ocean, and Antarctica to the South Pole.

The 82nd meridian west forms a great circle with the 98th meridian east.

From Pole to Pole
Starting at the North Pole and heading south to the South Pole, the 82nd meridian west passes through:

{| class="wikitable plainrowheaders"
! scope="col" width="120" | Co-ordinates
! scope="col" | Country, territory or sea
! scope="col" | Notes
|-
| style="background:#b0e0e6;" | 
! scope="row" style="background:#b0e0e6;" | Arctic Ocean
| style="background:#b0e0e6;" |
|-
| 
! scope="row" | 
| Nunavut — Ellesmere Island
|-
| style="background:#b0e0e6;" | 
! scope="row" style="background:#b0e0e6;" | Jones Sound
| style="background:#b0e0e6;" |
|-
| 
! scope="row" | 
| Nunavut — Devon Island
|-
| style="background:#b0e0e6;" | 
! scope="row" style="background:#b0e0e6;" | Lancaster Sound
| style="background:#b0e0e6;" |
|-
| 
! scope="row" | 
| Nunavut — Baffin Island
|-
| style="background:#b0e0e6;" | 
! scope="row" style="background:#b0e0e6;" | Foxe Basin
| style="background:#b0e0e6;" |
|-
| 
! scope="row" | 
| Nunavut — Melville Peninsula (mainland)
|-
| style="background:#b0e0e6;" | 
! scope="row" style="background:#b0e0e6;" | Foxe Basin
| style="background:#b0e0e6;" |
|-
| 
! scope="row" | 
| Nunavut — Southampton Island
|-
| style="background:#b0e0e6;" | 
! scope="row" style="background:#b0e0e6;" | Evans Strait
| style="background:#b0e0e6;" |
|-
| 
! scope="row" | 
| Nunavut — Coats Island
|-
| style="background:#b0e0e6;" | 
! scope="row" style="background:#b0e0e6;" | Hudson Bay
| style="background:#b0e0e6;" |
|-
| style="background:#b0e0e6;" | 
! scope="row" style="background:#b0e0e6;" | James Bay
| style="background:#b0e0e6;" |
|-
| 
! scope="row" | 
| Nunavut — Akimiski Island
|-
| style="background:#b0e0e6;" | 
! scope="row" style="background:#b0e0e6;" | James Bay
| style="background:#b0e0e6;" |
|-
| 
! scope="row" | 
| Ontario — mainland and Manitoulin Island
|-
| style="background:#b0e0e6;" | 
! scope="row" style="background:#b0e0e6;" | Lake Huron
| style="background:#b0e0e6;" |
|-
| 
! scope="row" | 
| Ontario
|-
| style="background:#b0e0e6;" | 
! scope="row" style="background:#b0e0e6;" | Lake Erie
| style="background:#b0e0e6;" |
|-valign="top"
| 
! scope="row" | 
| Ohio West Virginia — from  Kentucky — for about 2 km from  Virginia — from  Tennessee — from  North Carolina — from  South Carolina — from  Georgia — from  Florida — from 
|-
| style="background:#b0e0e6;" | 
! scope="row" style="background:#b0e0e6;" | Gulf of Mexico
| style="background:#b0e0e6;" | Passing just east of Boca Grande Key, Florida,  (at )
|-
| 
! scope="row" | 
|
|-
| style="background:#b0e0e6;" | 
! scope="row" style="background:#b0e0e6;" | Caribbean Sea
| style="background:#b0e0e6;" |
|-
| 
! scope="row" | 
| Canarreos Archipelago
|-
| style="background:#b0e0e6;" | 
! scope="row" style="background:#b0e0e6;" | Caribbean Sea
| style="background:#b0e0e6;" |
|-
| style="background:#b0e0e6;" | 
! scope="row" style="background:#b0e0e6;" | Gulf of Chiriquí
| style="background:#b0e0e6;" |
|-
| 
! scope="row" | 
|
|-valign="top"
| style="background:#b0e0e6;" | 
! scope="row" style="background:#b0e0e6;" | Pacific Ocean
| style="background:#b0e0e6;" | Passing just west of the island of Coiba,  (at )
|-
| style="background:#b0e0e6;" | 
! scope="row" style="background:#b0e0e6;" | Southern Ocean
| style="background:#b0e0e6;" |
|-
| 
! scope="row" | Antarctica
| Territory claimed by 
|-
|}

See also 
 81st meridian west
 83rd meridian west

w082 meridian west